Elections to the second Odisha Legislative Assembly were held in 1971.

Constituencies

The elections were held for 140 seats. A total of 835 candidates contested for these 140 seats.

Political Parties

Three national parties, Communist Party of India, Indian National Congress and Swatantra Party along with the state party Utkal Congress took part in the assembly election. Congress party emerged again as the winner by winning 40% of the seats with a vote share of 28.74%. Harekrushna Mahatab again become the Chief Minister of the state.

Government 

The United Front a coalition of Swatantra Party who won 36 Assembly seats and the new regional party Utkal Congress who won 33 Assembly seats formed the government under the leadership of Independent candidate Bishwanath Das.

Das resigned on June 14, 1972 due to defection of a large number of members from the ruling coalition and on same day Nandini Satpathy of the Indian National Congress formed the government and continued till March 1973. Nandini Satpathy ousted due in-fighting of the members after which there was imposition of President's rule in the state.

Results

Winning candidates

By-elections

See also
 1971 elections in India
 1967 Odisha Legislative Assembly election
 1974 Odisha Legislative Assembly election

References

State Assembly elections in Odisha
Odisha
1970s in Orissa